Anomalographis is a genus of two species of lichenized fungi in the family Graphidaceae.

References

Graphidaceae
Lichen genera
Ostropales genera
Taxa named by Klaus Kalb
Taxa described in 1992